The flag of the Poltava Region, Ukraine is the official flag of the Ukrainian province of Poltava. It was designed by E. Shyrai, and officially adopted  by the solution of the tenth session of the Poltava Oblast rada on February 10, 1999.

The flag consists of a yellow Cossack cross on a blue background, with a ratio of 2:3.

References

  Flags of the World website - Poltavs'ka oblast'

Flags of Ukraine
Flag
Flags introduced in 2000